John Ludy Riddle (October 3, 1905 – December 15, 1998) was an American professional baseball player and coach. He appeared in 98 games in Major League Baseball as a reserve catcher for the Chicago White Sox (1930), Washington Senators (1937), Boston Bees (1937–38), Cincinnati Reds (1941 and 1944–45) and Pittsburgh Pirates (1948). At the age of 42 in 1948 (as a player-coach), he was the oldest player to appear in a National League game that season. He was the older brother of Elmer Riddle, a star pitcher in the early 1940s as a member of the Reds.

Johnny Riddle was born in Clinton, South Carolina. His playing career was unusual in that not only did he once go seven years between major league appearances, it also took a span of nineteen years to appear in seven major league seasons. In those seven seasons, he got into an average of 14 games per year. Riddle spent 19 years in minor league baseball, including a dozen seasons as a member of the Indianapolis Indians of the top-level American Association.

Riddle made his major league debut on April 17, 1930 (Opening Day) against the Cleveland Indians at Comiskey Park. His last game was September 11, 1948 against the Chicago Cubs at Wrigley Field. In his MLB career  he was 51-for-214 (.238) with four doubles, a triple, 11 runs batted in, and 18 runs scored. On defense, he made only five errors and had a fielding percentage of .983.

Riddle spent all or parts of three seasons as a player-manager in minor league baseball (1942–44), and later worked for 10 years as a coach in the National League, for the Pirates (1948–50), St. Louis Cardinals (1952–55), Milwaukee Braves (1956–57), Cincinnati Redlegs (1958) and Philadelphia Phillies (1959). He won a World Series championship ring as the first base coach of the Braves in 1957.

Riddle died at the age of 93 in Indianapolis, where he ultimately made his home after his long tenure with the Indians.

See also
 List of St. Louis Cardinals coaches

References
 1953 Baseball Register published by The Sporting News

External links

 Retrosheet

1905 births
1998 deaths
Baseball coaches from South Carolina
Baseball players from South Carolina
Baseball coaches from Indiana
Baseball players from Indianapolis
Birmingham Barons managers
Birmingham Barons players
Boston Bees players
Chicago White Sox players
Cincinnati Redlegs coaches
Cincinnati Reds players
Indianapolis Indians players
Kansas City Blues (baseball) players
Major League Baseball catchers
Major League Baseball first base coaches
Milwaukee Braves coaches
People from Clinton, South Carolina
Philadelphia Phillies coaches
Pittsburgh Pirates coaches
Pittsburgh Pirates players
Quincy Indians players
St. Louis Cardinals coaches
Washington Senators (1901–1960) players